Virbia disparilis is a moth in the family Erebidae. It was described by Augustus Radcliffe Grote in 1866. It is found on Cuba.

References

Moths described in 1866
disparilis
Endemic fauna of Cuba